Hands Without Shadows 2 – Voices (commonly abbreviated as HWS2) is the sixth studio album by American progressive metal musician Michael Angelo Batio, released on September 8, 2009. Unlike the majority of his previous albums, which were almost exclusively instrumental, HWS2 features vocal performances on all tracks. The album features a number of guest musicians, in addition to vocalist Warren Dunlevy, Jr. and drummer Joe Babiak, who previously performed on Batio's 2007 compilation album 2 X Again. The album features a bonus track entitled "MAB Forum Shreddathon", which includes guitar solos by members of the official MAB forum, written by Los Angeles-based metal guitarist and longtime forum member Maxxxwell Carlisle.

Track listing

Personnel
Michael Angelo Batio – guitars
Warren Dunlevy, Jr. – vocals
Joe Babiak – drums

References

External links
Michael Angelo Batio official website

2009 albums
Michael Angelo Batio albums